Příbram District is a district in the Central Bohemian Region of the Czech Republic. Its capital is the town of Příbram.

Administrative division
Příbram District is divided into three administrative districts of municipalities with extended competence: Dobříš and Sedlčany.

List of municipalities
Towns are marked in bold and market towns in italics:

Bezděkov pod Třemšínem -
Bohostice -
Bohutín -
Borotice -
Bratkovice - 
Březnice -
Buková u Příbramě -
Bukovany -
Čenkov -
Cetyně -
Chotilsko -
Chrást -
Chraštice -
Čím -
Daleké Dušníky -
Dlouhá Lhota -
Dobříš -
Dolní Hbity -
Drahenice -
Drahlín -
Drásov -
Drevníky -
Drhovy -
Dubenec -
Dubno -
Dublovice -
Háje -
Hluboš -
Hlubyně -
Horčápsko -
Hudčice -
Hřiměždice -
Hvožďany -
Jablonná -
Jesenice -
Jince -
Kamýk nad Vltavou -
Klučenice -
Kňovice -
Korkyně -
Kosova Hora -
Kotenčice -
Koupě - 
Kozárovice - 
Krásná Hora nad Vltavou -
Křepenice -
Křešín -
Láz -
Lazsko -
Lešetice -
Lhota u Příbramě -
Malá Hraštice -
Milešov -
Milín -
Modřovice -
Mokrovraty -
Nalžovice -
Narysov -
Nečín -
Nedrahovice -
Nechvalice -
Nepomuk -
Nestrašovice -
Nová Ves pod Pleší -
Nové Dvory -
Nový Knín -
Občov -
Obecnice -
Obory -
Obořiště -
Ohrazenice -
Osečany -
Ostrov -
Ouběnice - 
Pečice -
Petrovice -
Pičín - 
Počaply -
Počepice -
Podlesí -
Prosenická Lhota -
Příbram -
Příčovy -
Radětice -
Radíč - 
Rosovice -
Rožmitál pod Třemšínem -
Rybníky -
Sádek -
Sedlčany -
Sedlec-Prčice -
Sedlice -
Smolotely -
Solenice -
Stará Huť -
Starosedlský Hrádek -
Štětkovice -
Suchodol -
Svaté Pole - 
Svatý Jan - 
Svojšice -
Těchařovice -
Tochovice -
Třebsko -
Trhové Dušníky -
Tušovice -
Velká Lečice -
Věšín -
Višňová -
Volenice -
Voznice -
Vrančice -
Vranovice -
Vševily -
Vysoká u Příbramě -
Vysoký Chlumec -
Zalužany -
Zbenice -
Zduchovice -
Županovice

Geography

The landscape is characterized by undulating terrain. From wide valleys in the east, the landscape gradually rises to long ridges and plateaus in the west, and here are the highest elevations in the region. The territory extends into three geomorphological mesoregions: Benešov Uplands (most of the territory), Brdy Highlands (west) and Vlašim Uplands (southeast).

The most important river is the Vltava, which flows across the district from south to north. Other notable rivers are Litavka and Kocába. The most significant bodies of water are the reservoirs Orlík, Kamýk and Slapy, built on the Vltava. There are also relatively many small ponds.

Brdy is the only protected landscape area that extends into the district, in its western part.

Demographics

Most populated municipalities

Economy
The largest employers with its headquarters in Příbram District and at least 500 employers are:

Transport
The D4 motorway from Prague to Písek, including its unfinished section, passes through the district.

Sights

The most important monuments in the district, protected as national cultural monuments, are:
Svatá Hora pilgrimage site in Příbram
Březnice Castle
A set of mining monuments in Příbram-Březové Hory

The best-preserved settlements, protected as monument reservations and monument zones, are:

Drahenice (monument reservation)
Březnice
Nový Knín
Rožmitál pod Třemšínem
Sedlec-Prčice
Drahenice-Račany
Kojetín
Porešín

The most visited tourist destination is the Svatá Hora pilgrimage site in Příbram.

References

External links

Příbram District profile on the Czech Statistical Office's website

 
Districts of the Czech Republic